Oversteps is the tenth album by electronic music duo Autechre, released on Warp Records in 2010. The album was made available for official download on bleep.com and the Japanese iTunes Store on 22 February 2010; the CD and deluxe vinyl editions were released on 22 March 2010. Critics were generally quite positive about Oversteps, with many considering it more focused and accessible than previous albums. A few months after its release, Oversteps was followed by a companion EP entitled Move of Ten.

Background and production
In a March 2010 interview with Clash, Autechre members Sean Booth and Rob Brown said they did not know if any other music influenced the development of Oversteps; Booth commented that "I don’t own a single record that sounds like 'Oversteps'". The dynamic between the duo in the studio was called "hilariously accommodating" in the same interview, with Booth stating "I don’t mind backing down".

Autechre streamed a twelve-hour webcast in early March 2010, coinciding with the album's release, as they had with the releases of Untilted and Quaristice.

Artwork 
The album artwork was created by The Designers Republic. In an interview with Warp Records, Ian Anderson of tDR explained that the album's artwork was based on a life-long influence of Anderson's, that of man versus machine. The cover is based on the idea that "[people are] trying to be as effective as machines and do the tasks that we’ve developed machines to do", and that a relatively simple task for a computer but an arduous one for a human is to draw a perfect circle. Anderson remarked that, in a March 2020 interview with Creative Boom editor Katy Cowan, while the duo described Oversteps as their "most unhuman album" to date, he thought that their material was more organic than their other work by comparison.

The artwork was created by staff at tDR who then attempted to create perfect circles by using a variety of materials and sizes. In all, seventy-two different circles were generated with paintbrushes and felt tip pens, making the covers of each format (CD, vinyl record, and in the case of digital, individual song artwork), print ad and merchandise a unique attempt at a perfectly drawn circle by a human. The concept would be applied to concentric rings forming circles for Autechre's follow-up EP, Move of Ten.

Release
Oversteps was released on 22 March 2010. Before its release, numerous fake versions of the album showed up on Internet websites, just as had happened with the previous three sets. Brown said it was "becoming a bit of a tradition" at the time of the album's release. Oversteps peaked at number 13 on the UK Official Charts Company's Independent Albums Chart. In the US, the album peaked at No. 15 and No. 46 on Billboards Dance/Electronic Albums and Heatseekers Albums charts, respectively, the week of 10 April 2010.

Reception

Oversteps received generally positive reviews, with most agreeing it is one of the band's most accessible albums to date.  Matt Kennedy of BBC was highly complimentary, and noted that while "Oversteps is certainly no exception to their outwardly difficult aesthetic.... Beneath the icy exterior, deceptively warm hearts beat". He added that, as per usual, the album was not immediately accessible, but that repeatedly listening to it is "the only method of absorbing Oversteps' depths", concluding, "Autechre continue to test themselves and listeners alike with stunningly intricate results."

Paul Clarke of Drowned in Sound agreed, saying Oversteps "initially still seems as imposing as an abandoned warehouse surrounded by nine feet of razor wire", but "does have entry points for the casual listener". He compared it to mid-1990s sets by fellow IDM group Future Sound of London, saying the album's songs "all seem to blossom out of each other to immerse the listener in a synaesthetic environment." He concluded his review on a similar note as Kennedy, saying, "Oversteps is still a challenging listen, and one which reveals endless layers of new detail with each spin. But it’s also their most instantly rewarding—and arguably best—album to date."

Patrick Sisson of Pitchfork Media said the album recalled earlier works such as Amber, saying, "the ambience and atmospheres of Oversteps are haunting." He also called the album "less rigid" and "almost organic", concluding that Autechre were "still incorporating new designs, not merely repackaging the previous products."

Track listing

References

External links
 Official release announcement

Autechre albums
2010 albums
Warp (record label) albums
Albums with cover art by The Designers Republic